The Critique of the Gotha Programme is a document based on a letter by Karl Marx written in early May 1875 to the Social Democratic Workers' Party of Germany (SDAP), with whom Marx and Friedrich Engels were in close association. 

Offering perhaps Marx's most detailed pronouncement on programmatic matters of revolutionary strategy, the document discusses the "dictatorship of the proletariat",  the period of transition from capitalism to communism, proletarian internationalism and the party of the working class. It is notable also for elucidating the principles of "To each according to his contribution" as the basis for a "lower phase" of communist society directly following the transition from capitalism and "From each according to his ability, to each according to his needs" as the basis for a future "higher phase" of communist society. In describing the lower phase, he states that "the individual receives from society exactly what he gives to it" and advocates remuneration in the form of non-transferable labour vouchers as opposed to money. 

The Critique of the Gotha Programme, published after his death, was among Marx's last major writings. The letter is named after the Gotha Programme, a proposed party platform manifesto for a forthcoming party congress that was to take place in the town of Gotha. At the party congress, the SDAP ("Eisenachers", based in Eisenach) planned to unite with the General German Workers' Association (ADAV, "Lassalleans", from Ferdinand Lassalle) to form a unified party. The Eisenachers sent the draft programme for a united party to Marx for comment. He found the programme negatively influenced by Lassalle, whom Marx regarded as an opportunist willing to limit the demands of the workers' movement in exchange for concessions from the government. However, at the congress held in Gotha in late May 1875 the draft programme was accepted with only minor alterations by what was to become the powerful Social Democratic Party of Germany (SPD). Marx's programmatic letter was published by Engels only much later, in 1891 when the SPD had declared its intention of adopting a new programme, the result being the Erfurt Programme of 1891.

editions 

 Critique of the Gotha Program, translated by Kevin B. Anderson and Karel Ludenhoff, Introduction by Peter Hudis,  Foreword by Peter Linebaugh,  PM Press/Spectre 2023, ISBN 9781629639161.

See also 
 Iron law of wages
 Marxism
 Marxist philosophy
 Marxist theory

References

External links 
 
 A Soviet study guide

Communist books
Books by Karl Marx
Social Democratic Party of Germany
program
Historical materialism